{{DISPLAYTITLE:Gamma1 Normae}}

Gamma1 Normae, Latinized from γ1 Normae, is a single, yellow-white hued star in the southern constellation of Norma. It is faintly visible to the naked eye with an apparent visual magnitude of 4.98. The annual parallax shift is only  as measured from Earth, which yields a rough distance estimate of 1,500 light years from the Sun. It is moving closer to the Sun with a radial velocity of around -16 km/s.

This is an F-type supergiant star with a stellar classification of F9 Ia It has 6.6 times the mass of the Sun and has expanded to about 160 times the Sun's radius. The star is radiating 2,040 times the Sun's luminosity from its enlarged photosphere at an effective temperature of 6,068 K. It is estimated to be around 53 million years old.

γ2 Nor is a nearby star nearly a magnitude brighter.

References

F-type supergiants
Norma (constellation)
Normae, Gamma1
Durchmusterung objects
146143
079790
6058